Gaiety Theatre or Gaiety Heritage Cultural Complex is a significant tourist hot spot of Shimla. It is located on The Ridge, Shimla. It is the hub of cultural events of the state. It also very popular among Bollywood as many music videos and movies are often filmed here, including one for the 2019 song "Pachtaoge" by Arijit Singh. The latest song shot here is "O Aasmanwale" by Jubin Nautiyal.

History 
Gaiety Theatre was opened on 30 May 1887, to a design by the English architect Henry Irwin. It is an example of the Gothic Revival style of architecture, derived from British Victorian examples. It was once part of the large Town Hall Complex. It had a capacity of more than 300 people. Initially, it was a five-story building with a theatre, ballroom, armoury, police office, bar, and galleries. After nearly two decades from its date of establishment, it was found that the building was structurally unsafe. It was partially demolished, but the Gaiety Theatre remains untouched.  With a rich history to its credit, the theatre was the center for entertainment and socialisation, where Viceroy Lord Lytton wrote and staged a play called Walpole, and Rudyard Kipling acted in 'a scrap of paper'. Legends like Baden Powell, K.L. Sehgal, Prithvi Raj Kapoor, Balraj Sahni, Pran, Tom Alter, Manohar Singh, Jennifer Kendall, Anupam Kher, Naseeruddin Shah, Shahid Kapoor, Ayushmann Khurrana, Udit Narayan, Sonu Nigam, Mohit Chauhan and Shreya Ghoshal and others have also performed here. At one time the popularity of English plays in the theatre earned the nickname, Mecca of Theatre.

Current time 

The room has superb acoustics, and though it has undergone some minor renovations, the screen used is still the same as the one designed by the architect. With an array of venues, including an exhibition hall, an art gallery, a multi-purpose hall, an amphitheatre, and an old theatre hall, this is the hub of performing arts in the state. The complex witnesses a huge volume of visitors year-round due to its cultural prominence. Even today, several drama societies actively use the space, which has also hosted renowned Indian actors and singers. The complex supports painting, photography, dance, drama, theatrics, elocution, sculpture, and classical and folk music. At the same time Gaiety Complex also provides Shimla schools an opportunity to participate in the cultural activities organised here. More than a century-old symbol of art and culture, the Gaiety is primarily known for its social club.

Art Gallery 
This gallery is attached to Lalit Kala Academy, New Delhi. It holds an exhibition of Nationally and Internationally renowned artists, highlighting modern and traditional art.

Exhibition Hall 
This is another exhibition hall, having display boards to exhibit paintings, sculptures, crafts, and photographs of the people belonging to India.

Multi-Purpose Hall 
The multi-purpose hall has a seating arrangement of 450 people, with all the modern facilities for indoor cultural activities.

Amphitheatre 
The amphitheatre is an open-air theatre for enacting street plays small interaction and open-air cultural programs with seating for 100 people.

In popular culture 
Gaiety Theatre has been used as a setting location for various films and music videos, such as many scenes of the movie Tamasha movie, the music video for "Pachtaoge" song by Arijit Singh, the song "Main Nikla Gaddi Le Ke" from the movie Gadar- Ek Prem Katha and the 2022 song "O Aasmanwale" by Jubin Nautiyal were filmed here.

References

Gothic Revival architecture in India
Theatres in India
British-era buildings in Himachal Pradesh